Lista Lighthouse is a coastal lighthouse located at the western side of the Lista peninsula, a short distance northwest of the village of Vestbygd in the municipality of Farsund in Agder county, Norway.  The lighthouse sits on a cape on the edge of the Listafjorden which marks the extreme southwestern edge of the mainland of Norway.  The lighthouse had a foghorn that was used from 1877 until 1987.  In 1937, the station began emitting a racon signal of the morse code letter "G".

In 2003, the station was automated and the buildings were turned over to Vest-Agder county.  The site is now used as a museum that is open daily during the summer months.

Media gallery

See also

Lighthouses in Norway
List of lighthouses in Norway

References

External links

 Norsk Fyrhistorisk Forening 

Lighthouses completed in 1836
Lighthouses in Agder
Listed lighthouses in Norway
Farsund